Grand Prix Circuit is a racing video game developed by Distinctive Software and published by Accolade for MS-DOS compatible operating systems in 1988. It was ported to the Amiga, Amstrad CPC, Apple IIGS, Commodore 64, and ZX Spectrum.

Gameplay 

Players can choose from three different cars in the game. They are:

McLaren MP4/4 (Honda 1.5L V6 turbo - )
Williams FW12C (Renault 3.5L V10 - )
Ferrari F1/87/88C (Ferrari 3.5L V12 - )

The McLaren-Honda turbo is the most powerful car in the game but is also the most difficult car to control. This is the  combination that won 15 out of 16 Grands Prix (along with 15 pole positions) in the hands of Ayrton Senna and Alain Prost.

The Williams-Renault is the next most powerful and the car is relatively neutral to control. It is the  combination. The FW12C was driven by Thierry Boutsen and Riccardo Patrese in 1989.

The Ferrari is actually the  turbo car's chassis with the V12 engine. This version did appear in public in 1988, but only as the test mule for Ferrari's 1989 engine and was never raced. As the slowest of the three the Ferrari is also the easiest to control. The test car was driven by the team's 1988 drivers Michele Alboreto and Gerhard Berger, as well as Ferrari test driver Roberto Moreno.

There are eight tracks in Grand Prix Circuit:

Jacarepaguá Circuit -  Brazil
Circuit de Monaco -  Monaco
Circuit Gilles Villeneuve -  Canada
Detroit street circuit -  Detroit
Silverstone -  Britain
Hockenheim -  Germany
Monza -  Italy
Suzuka  Japan

There are five difficulty levels and three playing modes: practice, single event and championship circuit and the game is accompanied by music written for the Commodore 64 by Kris Hatlelid. The high score/end of game music is based on "Na Na Hey Hey Kiss Him Goodbye" from 1969 by Paul Leka, Gary DeCarlo and Dale Frashuer.

Reception
A Computer Gaming World review had mixed feelings about the game, noting the controls, which governed steering, acceleration, and shifting all at the same time, took so long to get used to that the reviewer ended up asking a friend to do shifting for him. The review did note the game was quite good after getting used to the controls.

The game sold 100,000 units.

Legacy
As stated in an interview with BBC's Top Gear in 2010, Kazunori Yamauchi, the creator of the Gran Turismo racing franchise for the PlayStation, was initially introduced to the genre of racing simulators by Grand Prix Circuit.

References

External links
 Grand Prix Circuit at Lemon Amiga
 
 

1988 video games
Accolade (company) games
Amiga games
Amstrad CPC games
Apple IIGS games
Commodore 64 games
DOS games
Formula One video games
Classic Mac OS games
Racing video games
Video games developed in Canada
ZX Spectrum games
Distinctive Software games
Single-player video games